Malleshwaram (also referred as Malleshwara) is a northwest neighborhood and one of the zones of Bruhat Bengaluru Mahanagara Palike in Bengaluru, India. It was planned in 1889 after the great plague of 1898, developed as a suburb in 1892 and handed over to the city municipality in 1895. As per 1878 Survey of India map, the area came under the village of Ranganatha Palya  and later was named after the Kadu Malleshwara Temple. The neighbourhood houses many offices one them being World Trade Center Bengaluru. It also has shopping malls Mantri Square and Orion Mall (at the two ends of the locality). Education boards of the state- KSEEB and PU boards - are located here.

History
H. V. Nanjundaiah, the first Vice-Chancellor of Mysore University is credited with the building of the then suburb of Malleshwaram. The neighbourhood of Malleshwaram hosts people from all walks of life. The Nobel laureate C.V. Raman, scientist Krishnaswamy Kasturirangan,  badminton world champion Prakash Padukone and his daughter Deepika Padukone, noted Carnatic musician Doraiswamy Iyengar and film stars Saroja Devi, Ananth Nag and Jaggesh have all lived here. 

Malleshwaram is home to some of Bangalore's heritage cafés such as CTR Shri Sagar (1920s), Janatha Hotel, Raghvendra Stores, New Krishna Bhavan, Veena Stores, and Snehajeeevi Gowdara Egg Rice Adda.

Location
It is located in the North-Western part of the city and is in close proximity to Yeshwanthpur, Rajajinagar, Sadashivanagar, Seshadripuram and the Majestic Bus Stand. The closest metro stations to this place are the Sampige Road metro station and Srirampura metro station

Tourist attractions 
A few tourist attractions in and around Malleshwaram are Orion mall, Mantri mall, The Bangalore Palace , Iskon Temple and Sankey Lake.

Notable locations 
 Kadu Malleshwara Temple
 Sri Gangamma Devi Temple
 Sri Dakshinamukha Nandi Tirtha Kalyani Kshetra
 Sri Lakshmi Narasimha Temple
 Sri Venugopala Swamy Temple
 Sankey tank
 Mantri Square

References

External links

 Neighbourhoods in Bangalore